Hóc Môn is a township and capital of Hóc Môn District, Ho Chi Minh City, Vietnam.

References

Populated places in Ho Chi Minh City
District capitals in Vietnam
Townships in Vietnam